James Shelton Moody Jr. (born March 31, 1947) is a senior United States district judge of the United States District Court for the Middle District of Florida.

Education and career

Moody was born in Tampa, Florida. He received his Bachelor of Science degree from the University of Florida in 1969 and his Juris Doctor from the Fredric G. Levin College of Law at the University of Florida in 1972. He is a member of Florida Blue Key. From 1969 to 1972 he was a circulation manager for student publications at the University of Florida. Moody was in private practice in Florida from 1972 to 1994. From 1983 to 1994 he served as Director of the Hillsboro SunTrust Bank. From 1993 to 1998 he served as Director of the United Way of Hillsborough County. From 1985 to 1997 he served as Director of the United Way of East Hillsborough County. From 1982 to 1994 he served as Vice President and later director of Moody & Moody, Inc. He was elected circuit judge of Florida's Thirteenth Judicial Circuit (Hillsborough County), serving from 1995 to 2000.

Federal judicial service

President Bill Clinton nominated Moody to the United States District Court for the Middle District of Florida on June 8, 2000, to a new seat created by 113 Stat. 1501. Confirmed by the Senate on July 21, 2000, he received commission on July 28, 2000. He assumed senior status on March 31, 2014.

One notable case that he handled was that of Sami Al-Arian, whom he sentenced to the maximum 57 months in prison and three years of supervised release on May 1, 2006, for aiding a terrorist organization, the Palestine Islamic Jihad.

Personal life
Moody's daughter, Ashley, was elected Attorney General of Florida in the 2018 election. His son, James S. Moody III, was appointed as a Florida circuit court judge by Governor Ron DeSantis in 2022.

References

Sources

Official profile from the United States District Court for the Middle District of Florida

1947 births
Judges of the United States District Court for the Middle District of Florida
Living people
People from Tampa, Florida
United States district court judges appointed by Bill Clinton
University of Florida alumni
Fredric G. Levin College of Law alumni
Florida state court judges
20th-century American judges
21st-century American judges